Simon Greul chose to not defend his 2008 title.
Stéphane Robert defeated Michael Russell 7–6(2), 5–7, 7–6(5) in the final.

Seeds

Draw

Final four

Top half

Bottom half

References
 Main Draw
 Qualifying Draw

TEAN International - Singles
TEAN International